Pero meskaria, Meske's pero moth, is a species of moth in the family Geometridae (geometrid moths). It was described by Alpheus Spring Packard in 1876 and is found in North America, where it has been recorded from southern Texas west to California, east through Nevada, Utah and western Colorado.

The length of the forewings is 13–16 mm.

The larvae feed on Clematis drummondii.

Etymology
The species was named in honor of Otto von Meske.

References

Further reading
 Arnett, Ross H. (2000). American Insects: A Handbook of the Insects of America North of Mexico. CRC Press.
 Scoble, Malcolm J., ed. (1999). Geometrid Moths of the World: A Catalogue (Lepidoptera, Geometridae). 1016.

External links
Butterflies and Moths of North America
NCBI Taxonomy Browser, Pero meskaria

Geometridae
Moths described in 1876
Taxa named by Alpheus Spring Packard